Ahmed Khader A. Al-Muwallad (born 16 February 1988) is a Saudi Arabian athlete specialising in the high hurdles. He won a gold medal at the 2017 Asian Indoor and Martial Arts Games and a bronze at the 2017 Asian Championships.

His personal bests are 13.36 seconds in the 110 metres hurdles (+0.9 m/s, Prague 2018) and 7.57 seconds in the 60 metres hurdles (Mondeville 2018). The latter is the current national record.

International competitions

1Disqualified in the final

References

1988 births
Living people
Saudi Arabian male hurdlers
Athletes (track and field) at the 2010 Asian Games
Athletes (track and field) at the 2018 Asian Games
Asian Games competitors for Saudi Arabia
Islamic Solidarity Games competitors for Saudi Arabia
Islamic Solidarity Games medalists in athletics
21st-century Saudi Arabian people
20th-century Saudi Arabian people